Miklós Temesvári (born 27 July 1938) is a Hungarian retired football player and manager.

References

Living people
1938 births
Sportspeople from Miskolc
Hungarian footballers
Association football midfielders
Hungarian football managers
Nemzeti Bajnokság I managers
Debreceni VSC managers
Újpest FC managers
Maldives national football team managers
Diósgyőri VTK managers
KF Tirana managers